Osniel Tosca (born 30 June 1984 in Santa Clara, Villa Clara) is a Cuban triple jumper.

Career
His personal best jump is 17.52 metres, achieved in May 2007 in Caracas.

Personal best
Triple jump: 17.52 (wind: +1.0 m/s) –  Caracas, 11 May 2007

Achievements

References

External links

1984 births
Living people
Cuban male triple jumpers
Athletes (track and field) at the 2007 Pan American Games
Pan American Games medalists in athletics (track and field)
Pan American Games silver medalists for Cuba
People from Santa Clara, Cuba
Medalists at the 2007 Pan American Games
21st-century Cuban people